Cottage Grove, (formerly East 63rd-Cottage Grove) is an 'L' station and the current terminus of the CTA Green Line's East 63rd branch, located in the Woodlawn neighborhood. The station, situated at 800 East 63rd Street, opened on April 23, 1893. This station is the current terminal of the East 63rd branch of the Green Line, and the easternmost station on the 'L' system.

History

Cottage Grove officially opened in 1893 when the South Side Rapid Transit company extended its line from 39th Street to Jackson Park, just in time for the World's Columbian Exposition. The line was shortened to Stony Island and 63rd after the fair ended. Stony Island remained the terminus of the East 63rd branch for 88 years. However, on March 4, 1982, service east of 61st was suspended due to a defective bridge over the Illinois Central (now Metra Electric) tracks. Service on the East 63rd branch was restored on December 12, 1982, but only as far as the University station. In 1989, Cottage Grove was demolished and replaced with a new station, which opened in 1991. The new station was open for only three years before the entire Green Line closed for a renovation project in 1994.

Cottage Grove becomes a terminal

When the Green Line closed in 1994, the CTA was planning to re-extend the line from University to a new terminal at Dorchester. The new station would have offered connections to Metra Electric and South Shore Line trains, as well as CTA buses through a brand-new bus terminal. However, complaints from Woodlawn residents and Arthur M. Brazier forced a tough decision for the CTA to cut the line back to Cottage Grove. The East 63rd branch was partially demolished from Cottage Grove Avenue to Drexel Avenue to prevent in-service trains from traveling on the unrehabbed tracks east of Cottage Grove. When the line reopened in 1996, Cottage Grove became the terminal of the East 63rd branch. The rest of the line east of Cottage Grove, including the abandoned University station and the partially-built Dorchester station were completely demolished in September 1997.

Operations
The Cottage Grove station was never intended to be a terminus. Although the station has two platforms, the northern platform is the only one that is really ever used. This is because no fare controls exist on the southern platform, since the station originally only allowed inbound (Harlem/Lake-bound) boarding (a configuration still used by King Drive). For this reason, the southern platforms can only be used by trains that continue to the 61st or Lower 63rd Yards. The one-track setup works for Cottage Grove because the station only sees trains arrive/depart every 20–25 minutes. Since the East 63rd branch was torn down all the way to Cottage Grove, no turnaround tracks exist east of the station. Trains needing to switch to the northern platform must use the crossover tracks just west of the station.

Bus connections
CTA
4 Cottage Grove (Owl Service)
X4 Cottage Grove Express (weekday rush hours only)
63 63rd (Owl Service)

Image gallery

Notes and references

Notes

References

External links
Cottage Grove Station Page at Chicago-L.org
Cottage Grove Avenue entrance from Google Maps Street View

CTA Green Line stations
Chicago "L" terminal stations
Railway stations in the United States opened in 1893
Former North Shore Line stations